1007 is a calendar year. It may also refer to:

Transportation
 CANT Z.1007 Alcione, an Italian three-engined medium bomber
 Kentucky Route 1007, a highway in Hopkinsville, Kentucky, United States
 Peugeot 1007, a 2005–2009 French mini MPV

Other uses
 1007 Pawlowia, an asteroid from the asteroid belt
 Papyrus Oxyrhynchus 1007, a fragment of a Septuagint manuscript